Sorted Food is a British YouTube channel and food community created by Benjamin 'Ben' Ebbrell, Michael 'Mike' Huttlestone, Jamie Spafford and Barry Taylor. The YouTube channel was created on March 10, 2010, and has grown a large food and cooking community. They created the Sorted Club (stylized as sorted club), which is a subscription based collection of apps to "learn, explore and change your routine for the better".

History
The Sorted Food YouTube channel was launched in March 2010 by Jamie Spafford, Ben Ebbrell, Barry Taylor, and Mike Huttlestone, who were school friends from Hertfordshire. Around 2014, James Currie, who met Ebbrell in culinary school, joined the team first as a developmental chef and then as an on-camera personality. The channel's recipes are intended to be accessible to a large number of people. This was the idea of Ebbrell, the only original member with any culinary training, who started suggesting simple and cheap recipes for the others to try instead of eating only ready meals.

In 2015, the four Sorted Food members went on a three-month USA tour for NBC's Today show.

In May 2021, the team announced that Currie would be leaving to take a new job.

Current content
As of April 2021, the company had 12 employees based in Tower Hill. According to a November 2022 video, the company has grown to 25 employees.

Sorted works with a number of brand partners on large-scale sponsored content. Some examples include Visit The USA, Kenwood Kitchen Appliances, Ford, Heinz, Android, and Blizzard. A proportion of their video content centers around travel and destination marketing, using that to unlock new food adventures from locations, cuisines, and cultures less familiar to them.

Publishing
The first two Sorted cookbooks, A Recipe for Student Survival and A Rookies Guide to Crackin' Cooking, were self-published in 2008 and 2012 respectively through "Co-Incidence Ventures" and released in both paperback and hardback editions. In 2012 they signed with Penguin Books and released a beginners cookbook, Beginners Get... Sorted, and an eBook, Food with Friends, which is also available in individual chapters. In 2017, the friends created Desserts in Duvets with the aid of a KickStarter campaign, funded by their ever-growing online community.

In 2021, the company reprinted and sold copies of Can't be Arsed 1 and 2.

Reach and awards
 the YouTube channel had over 2.37 million subscribers and more than half a billion video views. Sorted Food has gained an influence on social media, with over 187,000 followers on Twitter (as of Jan 2022), over 265,000 followers on Facebook and over 240,000 followers on Instagram. They were listed 4th in The Guardians "30 Under 30: The Top Young People in Digital Media" in 2014.

"Best Online Program - Entertainment Award" 2011 Banff World Media Festival.

"New Media Award" 2014 Guild of Food Writers awards.

Ebbrell won the Good Food Channel's Market Kitchen search for the "next celebrity chef".

"Best Online Content" 2017 UK Blog Awards and were nominated for "Best Series of Videos" for their Game Changers work with the US Tourism Board at the CMAs.

Recent press, TV, and radio coverage include: Observer Magazine, Good Morning Britain, Blue Peter, Heat, The Sun, Delicious Magazine, Russell Howard's Christmas special, Radio 2, BBC 5Live, Shortlist, TES, New Business Magazine, and Sky News in the UK. Plus have had regular appearances on America's The TODAY Show.

Books
In 2017, they started a book club and publish books every 3 months exclusively to book club members.

References

External links
 
 

2010 web series debuts
British non-fiction web series
cooking web series
YouTube original programming